What's Happening Now!! is an American sitcom sequel to the original ABC 1976–79 sitcom What's Happening!! focusing on its main characters as adults. It aired in first-run broadcast syndication from September 7, 1985 until March 26, 1988.

Overview
In the series, Roger "Raj" Thomas (played by Ernest Thomas) has become a fledgling writer. He bought half of the restaurant Rob's Place (renamed Rob's) and was running the business with Shirley (Shirley Hemphill), making money for himself and his new wife Nadine (Anne-Marie Johnson), who was a social worker. Dwayne (Haywood Nelson) has become a computer programmer, and Rerun (Fred Berry) a used-car salesman. Raj and Nadine live in Raj's childhood home while Rerun and Dwayne share an apartment.

Episodes

Cast
 Ernest Thomas as Roger "Raj" Thomas
 Anne-Marie Johnson as Nadine Hudson-Thomas
 Haywood Nelson as Dwayne Nelson
 Fred Berry as Fred "Rerun" Stubbs (season 1)
 Shirley Hemphill as Shirley Wilson
 Reina King as Carolyn Williams (season 1)
 Martin Lawrence as Maurice Warfield (season 3)
 Ken Sagoes as Darryl (season 3)
 Danielle Spencer as Dee Thomas (recurring)

After the first season, the producers fired Fred Berry from the series and no further mention was made of Rerun from that point forward. Berry was said to have been causing problems from the beginning of taping, believing that he should have been paid a significantly higher salary than any of his co-stars because of Rerun’s popularity as a character.

Broadcast
A partial list of stations the show was syndicated to:

Home media
On June 12, 2007, Sony Pictures Home Entertainment released the first season of What's Happening Now!! on DVD in Region 1.

References

External links

1985 American television series debuts
1988 American television series endings
1980s American sitcoms
1980s American black sitcoms
English-language television shows
First-run syndicated television programs in the United States
American sequel television series
Television series about marriage
Television series by Sony Pictures Television
Television shows set in Los Angeles